Sara Lalama (born 14 February 1993), is an Algerian actress. She had roles in the television serials Masha'er, Le rendez-vous and Hob Fi Kafas El Itiham.

Personal life
She was born on 14 February 1993 in Constantine, Algeria.

Career
She began her career in France Theater. She trained cinema at the Toulon Regional Conservatory (Ecole De Musique Toulon Initiation), France for four years. In 2013, she made her maiden television role in the soap opera Asrar el madi aired on Algeria 3. With the success in the serial, she was invited to act in the comedy series, La classe in 2014. In the serial, she played the role of 'Nourhane'. Then in 2015, Lalama played the leading role 'Yasmine' in television serial Hob Fi Kafas El Itiham directed by Bachir Sellami.

In 2016, she made the cinema debut role 'Nedjma' with the film El boughi. Later in the same year, she played the role of 'Quamar', in the soapie Qoloub Tahta Ramad directed by Bachir Sellami. In 2017, she starred in the serial Samt El Abriyaa. Since 2019, she has been featured on the soapie Masha'er broadcast in both Algeria and Tunisia. In the same year, she participated to the Algerian adventure game show Chiche Atahaddak.

Filmography

References

External links
 
 sara lalama

Living people
Algerian television actresses
Algerian actresses
1993 births
People from Constantine, Algeria
21st-century Algerian people